Vichentie Birău (1929 – 1992) was a Romanian football forward.

International career
Vichentie Birău played one game at international level for Romania in a friendly which ended with a 3–2 loss against East Germany.

Honours
UTA Arad
Divizia A: 1954

References

1929 births
1992 deaths
Romanian footballers
Romania international footballers
Association football forwards
Liga I players
Liga II players
FC UTA Arad players